Pförring is a municipality  in the district of Eichstätt in Bavaria in Germany.

References

Eichstätt (district)